John David Pritchard (January 23, 1927 – August 3, 2012) was an American professional basketball player. Pritchard was selected in the seventh round of the 1949 BAA Draft by the St. Louis Bombers after a collegiate career at Drake. He played for the Waterloo Hawks for seven total games in 1949. He then spent time playing for the Washington Generals, the traveling exhibition team who always play, and lose to, the Harlem Globetrotters.

References

External links
 John Pritchard obituary

1927 births
2012 deaths
American men's basketball players
Basketball players from Minneapolis
Centers (basketball)
Drake Bulldogs men's basketball players
St. Louis Bombers (NBA) draft picks
Washington Generals players
Waterloo Hawks players
South High School (Minnesota) alumni